Matthias Looß (born August 17, 1975) is a German nordic combined skier who competed from 1996 to 2001.  At the 1998 Winter Olympics in Nagano, he finished sixth in the 4 x 5 km team event.

Looß's best World Cup finish was eighth on three occasions at various distances in 1997 and 1998.  He earned three individual career victories from 1996 to 2001, all in World Cup B events.

External links
 

1975 births
Nordic combined skiers at the 1998 Winter Olympics
German male Nordic combined skiers
Living people
Nordic combined Grand Prix winners